The Home Place is a play written by Brian Friel that first premiered at the Gate Theatre, Dublin on 1 February 2005.
  After a sold-out season at the Gate, it transferred to the Comedy Theatre (now Harold Pinter Theatre), in London's West End, on 25 May 2005, where it won the 2005 Evening Standard Award for Best Play, and made its American premiere at the Guthrie Theater (Minneapolis, MN) in September 2007.

Summary
The play is set in the summer of 1878 in the fictional village of Ballybeg, County Donegal, at the house ("The Lodge") of Christopher Gore, who lives with his son David, and their longtime housekeeper Margaret. Christopher is a widowed land-owner from England ("the home place" of Kent).  Both he and his son David are in love with Margaret.  Two guests are staying at The Lodge, Dr Richard Gore, Christopher's cousin, and Dr Gore's assistant, Perkins.  Dr Gore is an anthropologist and is traveling throughout Ireland recording the physical characteristics of the locals.

Dr Gore's methods and racist hypotheses ignite animosity in the town, where a despised English landlord, Lord Lifford, was recently murdered. Christopher is caught in the middle between his cousin and his allegiance to the locals.  The play runs the course of a single day in Ballybeg and centers on the resurgence of the Home rule movement in Ireland. The Lifford killing is based on the actual murder of William Clements, 3rd Earl of Leitrim in April 1878.

Characters
 Christopher Gore - Owner of The Lodge and a landlord in Ballybeg.  
 David Gore - Son of Christopher. 
 Dr. Richard Gore - Cousin of Christopher Gore, Anthropologist. 
 Perkins - Assistant to Dr Gore. 
 Lord Lifford - Local landlord, recently killed.  
 Margaret O'Donnell - Head housekeeper at The Lodge. 
 Clement O'Donnell - Father of Margaret, local schoolmaster and choir leader. 
 Sally Cavanagh - housekeeper at The Lodge
 Con Doherty - local voice/leader of disapproval of Dr Gore's work
 Johnny MacLoone - local, strongman for Con
 Tommy Boyle - young local
 Maisie McLaughlin - young local
 Mary Sweeney - local

Original Cast
When the show first premiered, the original cast was:

 Christopher Gore - Tom Courtenay
 David Gore - Hugh O'Conor
 Dr. Richard Gore - Nick Dunning
 Perkins - Pat Kinevane
 Margaret O'Donnell - Derbhle Crotty
 Clement O'Donnell - Barry McGovern
 Sally Cavanagh - Laura Jane Laughlin
 Con Doherty - Adam Fergus
 Johnny MacLoone - Michael Judd
 Tommy Boyle - Bill Ó Cléirigh / Kenneth McDonnell (alternated shows)
 Maisie McLaughlin - Leanna Duke / Ciara Lyons
 Mary Sweeney - Brenda Larby

References

2005 plays
Plays by Brian Friel